William Addo  or Willie Addo, also known as Akpatse, is a Ghanaian [actor and producer who has done a lot of works to grow the Ghanaian movie industry.

Education 
He attend the University of Ghana were he obtained a degree in Drama and Theatre Studies and was retained as a teaching assistance because of his performance. He had a scholarship to study in University of Leeds in the United Kingdom where he obtained his master's degree in Theatre Studies, majoring in Acting and Directing, he came back to be a lecture where he was in charge of Theatre Arts Department of the School of Performing Arts, University of Ghana.

Career 
He worked at the National Theatre where he was in charge of the production of concert party.

Filmography 
List of movies.

 Death After Birth
 Chronicles of Odumkrom: The Headmaster
 Children of the Mountain
Rejected 1 & 2

References

External Link

Ghanaian male actors
21st-century Ghanaian actors
University of Ghana alumni
Living people
Year of birth missing (living people)